The Kenya national football team represents Kenya in association football. It is controlled by the Football Kenya Federation, the governing body  football in Kenya, and competes as a member of the Confederation of African Football (CAF) and the Council for East and Central Africa Football Associations (CECAFA). It is colloquially known as Harambee Stars and plays its home games primarily at the Nyayo National Stadium in the capital, Nairobi.

History
Kenya qualified for the 2019 AFCON. The head coach at the time Sébastien Migné was appointed in May 2018, and since his appointment Kenya has climbed back into the top 100 FIFA ranked nations.

In May 2017, the Football Kenya Federation signed a 3-year partnership with kits manufacturer Mafro Sports to provide the kits for all national teams, as well as junior categories. The national team will use red jerseys for home matches, white jerseys for away matches, and green jerseys for matches played on neutral venues.

On 8 September 2018, Kenya earned a win over 4-time African champions Ghana, winning 1–0.

On the 8th of March 2021, the Football Kenya Federation President Nick Mwendwa and Odibets General Manager Dedan Mungai unveiled a partnership. The partnership was the first of its kind where the betting company Odibets would sponsor the Kenyan football team to prepare for 5 upcoming matches. The 5 million shilling motivation deal was set in place to cater for the team's wants and needs. While it was set as a continuous partnership, the initial donation of KSH 5,000,000 was made as a 1 time payment.

Recent results

2022

2023

Coaching history
Caretaker managers are listed in italics.

 Ray Bachelor (1961)
 Jack Gibbons (1966)
 Elijah Lidonde (1967)
 Eckhard Krautzun (1971)
 Jonathan Niva (1972)
 Ray Wood (1975)
 Grzegorz Polakow (1979)
 Stephen Yongo (1979)
 Marshall Mulwa (1980–83)
 Bernhard Zgoll (1984)
 Reinhard Fabisch (1987, 1997, 2001–02)
 Christopher Makokha (1988)
 Mohammed Kheri (1988–90, 1995, 2005
 Gerry Saurer (1992)
 Vojo Gardašević (1996)
 Abdul Majid (1998)
 Christian Chukwu (1998)
 James Siang'a (1999–00)
 Joe Kadenge (2002)
 Jacob "Ghost" Mulee (2003–04, 2007–08, 2010, 2020–2021)
 Twahir Muhiddin (2004–05, 2009–10)
 Bernard Lama (2006)
 Tom Olaba (2006)
 Jacob "Ghost" Mulee (2007–08)
 Francis Kimanzi (2008–09, 2011–12)
 Antoine Hey (2009)
 Zedekiah Otieno (2010–11)
 Henri Michel (2012)
 James Nandwa (2012–13)
 Adel Amrouche (2013–14)
 Bobby Williamson (2014–16)
 Stanley Okumbi (2016–17, 2018)
 Paul Put (2017–2018)
 Sebastien Migne (2018–2019)
 Francis Kimanzi (2019–2020)
 Ken Odhiambo (2021)
 Engin Fırat (2021 - present)

Source : RSSSF

Players
The following players have been selected in the preliminary squad for the friendly match against Iran on 28 March 2023.

Caps and goals are correct as of 15 November 2021, after the match against Rwanda.

Records

Players in bold are still active with it.

Competition records

FIFA World Cup

Africa Cup of Nations

African Games

CECAFA Cup
 Winners: 1975, 1981, 1982, 1983, 2002, 2013, 2017
 Runners-up: 1979, 1985, 1991, 1999, 2001, 2008, 2012

Suspension

FIFA suspended Kenya from all football activities for 3 months in 2004, due to the interference of the government in football activities. The ban was reversed after the country agreed to create new statutes.

On 25 October 2006, Kenya was suspended from international football for failing to fulfill a January 2006 agreement made to resolve recurrent problems in its federation. FIFA announced that the suspension would be in force until the federation complies with the agreements previously reached.

On 14th January 2023, Football Kenya Federation stated that it had suspended 14 players, including six players from Zoo Kericho FC and two coaches for match-fixing allegations.

References

External links

 Kenya at FIFA.com (archived 13 June 2007)
 FoStats.com – Database of all Kenyan players and coaches
 Futaa.com – Kenyan Football Portal

African national association football teams
 
National sports teams established in 1926